Caldanaerovirga is a  xylanolytic, anaerobic and alkalithermophilic genus of bacteria from the family of Thermosediminibacterales with one known species (Caldanaerovirga acetigignens).

References

Further reading 
 

 

Thermoanaerobacterales
Monotypic bacteria genera
Bacteria genera
Thermophiles
Anaerobes